{{Infobox feature on celestial object
|name        = Abaya Lacus
|image       = Titan's "Kissing Lakes".jpg
|caption     = Titan's "kissing lakes", Abaya Lacus, as viewed by Cassinis synthetic aperture radar.
|type        = Lacus
|coordinates = 
|diameter    = 65 km
|eponym      = Lake Abaya
}}Abaya Lacus''' is one of a number of hydrocarbon lakes found on Saturn's largest moon, Titan.

The lake is composed of liquid methane and ethane, and was detected by the Cassini'' space probe.

Abaya Lacus is located at coordinates 73.17°N and 45.55°W on Titan's globe and is 65 km in length. It is named after Lake Abaya in Ethiopia.

Notes

References

Lakes of Titan (moon)